Wentworth Institute of Technology (WIT) is a private institute of technology in Boston, Massachusetts. Wentworth was founded in 1904 and offers career-focused education through 22 bachelor's degree programs as well as 11 master's degrees.

History

In 1903, Boston businessman Arioch Wentworth donated the majority of his estate, estimated at $7 million, for the purpose of founding an industrial school within Boston. A board of seven directors incorporated Wentworth Institute on April 5, 1904, as a school "to furnish education in the mechanical arts". The directors spent several years investigating the educational needs of the community, increased the endowment, and reached a settlement with Wentworth's daughter, who had contested his will. Frederick Atherton was Trustee Secretary. The campus was established in Boston's Back Bay Fens, and Arthur L. Williston was the first principal of the college.

On September 25, 1911, Wentworth opened as a technical school to 242 students. By 1919 the school had 1,800 students and 45 teachers. Wentworth became a degree-granting institution in 1957 and awarded its first baccalaureate-level degrees in 1970.

In 1972, the institute admitted its first female students. In 1973, Wentworth instructors unionized to join the American Federation of Teachers and on October 28, 1977, the teachers of Wentworth went on strike. In 1977, the college's lower and upper divisions merged as the Wentworth Institute of Technology. Wentworth acquired the former Ira Allen School building from the city of Boston in 1980 and the former Boston Trade High School in 1983.

In November 2009, Wentworth became a master's degree-granting institution, with the creation and accreditation of its master of architecture program. Wentworth received approval for university status from the Massachusetts Department of Higher Education in July 2017.

Mark A. Thompson became the fifth president of Wentworth Institute of Technology on June 1, 2019. He succeeded Zorica Pantic, who was the first female engineer to head an institute of technology in higher education in the United States.

In September 2021, Wentworth was ranked #31 amongst Regional Universities North by U.S. News & World Report. As of April 2022, Wentworth offers bachelor's degrees in 22 engineering, technology, design, and management disciplines.

Campus

The Wentworth campus is located in the Fenway neighborhood of Boston. It consists of 15 buildings for administrative and faculty offices, classrooms, laboratories, library, and athletic facilities. Students enrolled for full-time study may live in one of nine residence halls near the main campus buildings.

The institute's collaborating neighbors include the Massachusetts College of Art and Design, Northeastern University, the Massachusetts College of Pharmacy and Health Sciences, and the Museum of Fine Arts.

Wentworth is a member of the Colleges of the Fenway consortium, and shares many facilities and activities with nearby institutions. With this membership, Wentworth students are entitled to register for course with participating neighboring institutions at no additional cost.

Student life

Enrollment

Total enrollment (2018): 4,516 total (4,341 undergraduate and 175 graduate students)
Men: 77%
Women: 23%

Athletics 
Wentworth Institute of Technology's athletic teams are nicknamed the Leopards. Wentworth is a member of the NCAA Division III and participates in the Commonwealth Coast Conference as a non-football member.

Notable alumni
 Vahe Aghabegians, technology adviser to the Armenian government
 Luther Blount (MC&TD '37), entrepreneur, prolific inventor
 George Chamillard (IE '58), former chairman and CEO of Teradyne, Inc.
 Russell Colley (MC&TD '18), prolific inventor, NASA engineer, inventor of silver nylon space suit used in first crewed space flight
 John B. Kennedy, city manager, politician 
 Joe Lauzon (BCOS '06), professional mixed martial artist, competing in the UFC's Lightweight Division
 David Lovering (EET '82), musician, drummer for the Pixies
 Stephen F. Lynch (CMW '88), United States Representative from Massachusetts
 Cindy Stumpo, American entrepreneur and residential contractor numerous national publications
 John A. Volpe (AC '30), Governor of Massachusetts, United States Secretary of Transportation, namesake of the John A. Volpe National Transportation Systems Center

References

External links

 Official website

 
Universities and colleges in Boston
Educational institutions established in 1904
Engineering universities and colleges in Massachusetts
Private universities and colleges in Massachusetts
1904 establishments in Massachusetts